Alfa Nero is a super yacht built in 2007. Registered in the Cayman Islands at 267 feet, in March of 2022, Forbes reported that Alfa Nero was still owned by Andrei Guriev with a value of $81 million.

History and design 
Alfa Nero was designed by Nuvolari & Lenard and built by Oceanco in 2007. The interior of Alfa Nero was designed by Alberto Pinto. 

In September 2009, it was reported that Alfa Nero was being listed for sale for $190,000,000. Alfa Nero is frequently sailed by Andrey Guryev. 

In March of 2022, Forbes reported that Alfa Nero was still owned by Andrei Guriev. Registered in the Cayman Islands with a value of $81 million at 267 feet, on March 3, it was recorded at Philipsburg, St. Martin.

The yacht features a  pool on the aft deck that can, through a hydraulic system, transform into a dance floor or a helipad. Alfa Nero was refitted in 2013.

The master suite occupies the entire forward aspect of the upper deck, which is private and self-contained. Inside the suite, colours are pale and the space has opulent design. Other suites have coordinated colours. Designers Nuvolari and Lenard planned the saloons, including dining saloons. The full beam upper saloon has palatial design, while the main deck saloon is contemporary. On the top deck, with views through 180 degree windows, is a diversion gym, while on the lower deck there is a health and beauty spa.

See also
 List of yachts built by Oceanco

References

External links

List of Mega Yachts
 Alfa Nero at YachtAndCrew

2007 ships
Ships built in the Netherlands
Motor yachts